The 1970 Tasman Series was a motor racing competition staged in New Zealand and Australia for cars complying with the Tasman Formula. It was the seventh Tasman Series, beginning on 3 January and ending on 22 February after seven races. The series was won by Graeme Lawrence of New Zealand, driving the Ferrari 246T that fellow New Zealander Chris Amon raced to win the 1969 Tasman Series.

1970 was a transitional year for the series, being the first year not involving the European Formula One teams which had given the Tasman Series its distinctive style. It was also the first year in which stock production engines of up to five litres cubic capacity were allowed, in short, Formula 5000. Entries arrived from both Europe and the United States, although not of the same quality of the earlier Tasman Formula era. Traditional 2.5 litre Tasman cars, like Lawrence's Ferrari, continued to race along with the 1.6 litre cars that filled much of the lower end of the grids during the Tasman era.

Results

Races
The Bay Park International, held on 28 December 1969, one week before the first round, was a non-championship event. Additional information sourced from:

Standings 
All scores from points-scoring races were counted

Key

References

1970
Tasman Series
Tasman Series
Formula 5000